Holy Week lemonade or, as it's known in Spain, Leonese lemonade
 is a traditional drink from León made out of wine, lemons, sugar and cinnamon (sometimes, fruits such as raisins and figs are also included). It can take from three to eight days to prepare, depending on the recipe. Traditionally, it was drunk at any festive event, although nowadays it's customarily served during Holy Week.

See also 
 Lemonade
 Sangria, or wine lemonade
 List of lemonade topics

References 

Lemonade
Leonese cuisine
Holy Week